Dodonovo is a village near Zheleznogorsk, Krasnoyarsk Krai. It was founded in 1949. In 1950-1960 there lived builders of the city and their families. People in Dodonovo speaks Central Russian dialects.

References

Rural localities in Krasnoyarsk Krai
Populated places on the Yenisei River
Zheleznogorsk Urban Okrug, Krasnoyarsk Krai